Shahin Ahvaz Football Club, commonly known as Shahin Ahvaz, is an Iranian football club based in Ahvaz, Khuzestan, that competes in the Khuzestan Premier League. The club was founded in 1948.

The football team plays their home games at the Takhti Ahvaz which has a seating capacity of 15,000.

Shahin Ahvaz is the oldest existing football club in Ahvaz alongside Esteghlal Ahvaz and has a large history in Iranian football. The club also consists of various other departments including a basketball team.

History

Establishment
The club was founded with the help of Hasan Fakheri by Abdol Jalil Khazamipour in 1948. The club was one of Shahin Tehran branches at the time. From the beginning Shahin Ahvaz was able to attract some of the best players of Khuzestan.

The golden years were in the 1980s when the team was being managed by Dr. Shariati, Mr. Ashrafi, and Mr. Nasirabbasi. The team won their first every "Hazfi" cup after defeating Perspolis Tehran in the semi-finals and then Malavan Anzali in the final game. With that championship, they made it to the AFC cup. Shahin Ahvaz hosted the first round and they beat all three teams and advanced to the next round.
After that year, almost every player left the team and moved on to other teams with bigger contracts. The management started with fresh and young new players, however due mostly to lack of sponsorships and mismanagement after the passing of Dr. Shariati and departure of Mr. Nasirabbasi, and Mr. Ashrafi, Shahin was never able to re-claim their past golden era and always remained in the second division.

Season-by-Season

The table below chronicles the achievements of Shahin Ahvaz in various competitions since 2007.

Head coaches
 Saeed Salamat

Players

First Team Squad
As of May 23, 2010

For recent transfers, see List of Iranian football transfers, summer 2010.

Honors
Hazfi Cup:Winners (1): 1988

Iran's representative at 1989-90 Asian Club Championship

References

Football clubs in Iran
Association football clubs established in 1948
1948 establishments in Iran